Richard Earl Fikes (born October 4, 1942) is a computer scientist and Professor (Research) Emeritus in the Computer Science department of Stanford University. He is professionally active as a consultant and expert witness. He led Stanford's Knowledge Systems Laboratory from 1991 to 2006, and has held appointments at Berkeley, Carnegie-Mellon, Price Waterhouse Technology Centre, Xerox PARC, and SRI International.

Early life and education

Fikes was born in Mobile, Alabama, and lived most of his early life in San Antonio, Texas.  He graduated from Sam Houston High School (San Antonio, Texas) in 1960, received a B.A. degree in mathematics from the University of Texas at Austin in 1963, and received an M.A. degree in mathematics from the University of Texas at Austin in 1965.  Fikes received his Ph.D. in computer science from Carnegie Mellon University in 1968.

Career
Fikes' research activities have primarily been in developing techniques for effectively representing and using knowledge in computer systems—a sub-field of Artificial Intelligence generally known as KR&R, for knowledge representation and reasoning.  He was a co-developer of the STRIPS automatic planning system, Knowledge Interchange Format language for interchange of logical knowledge bases, the Ontolingua ontology engineering environment, and IntelliCorp's Knowledge Engineering Environment (KEE).  He also worked on the Shakey the Robot project at SRI International.  Before joining the faculty at Stanford University, he held positions at SRI International, Xerox PARC, IntelliCorp, and the Price Waterhouse Technology Center.

Fikes retired from his positions of Professor (Research) in the Computer Science department of Stanford University and director of Stanford's Knowledge Systems Laboratory in 2006.  He was given a retirement party that was a large gathering of early luminaries in the field of Artificial Intelligence.  A video from that party showing tributes and a career reflections speech by Fikes can be found at https://www.youtube.com/watch?v=vl2XBb2uGLw.

Memberships and awards
Fikes has published numerous articles in journals and conference proceedings, and has also served as editor of several professional journals in Artificial Intelligence and related areas. Fikes has also chaired, co-chaired, organized, or served on the program committee of numerous professional conferences and symposia. In 1990 he was elected as a Fellow of the Association for the Advancement of Artificial Intelligence.

References

Artificial intelligence researchers
Carnegie Mellon University alumni
Living people
1942 births
Fellows of the Association for the Advancement of Artificial Intelligence
SRI International people